Rodolfo Díaz (born 13 March 1946) is a Filipino boxer. He competed in the men's flyweight event at the 1968 Summer Olympics. At the 1968 Summer Olympics, he lost to Kenny Mwansa of Zambia.

References

External links
 

1946 births
Living people
Filipino male boxers
Olympic boxers of the Philippines
Boxers at the 1968 Summer Olympics
Sportspeople from Rizal
Asian Games medalists in boxing
Boxers at the 1966 Asian Games
Asian Games bronze medalists for the Philippines
Medalists at the 1966 Asian Games
Flyweight boxers